Ferdousi is a Persian given name, a variant of Ferdowsi. It is also commonly used in Bangladesh. Notable people with the name include:

 Ferdousi Mazumder (born 1943), Bangladeshi actress
 Ferdousi Rahman (born 1941), Bangladeshi singer
 Ferdousi Priyabhashini (1947–2018), Bangladeshi sculptor